The Copper Beech is a 1992 novel by the Irish author Maeve Binchy. Set in the 1950s and 1960s, the storyline follows the lives of 12 characters living in a small Irish town, in chapters with interlocking plot elements. The novel was recorded as a BBC audiobook in 2007.

Plot
The novel follows the lives of 12 different young people in the small Irish town of Shancarrig, most of them graduates of the stone schoolhouse on the hill where they engraved their initials on a large copper beech tree. Each chapter is told from the viewpoint of one of the characters, although the plot details often reappear in other chapters.

Maura Brennan has no choice but to work after her schooling. She has a drunken father and so is happy to work as a live-in chamber maid in Ryan's hotel. Nessa's mother prefers that her daughter does not speak with Maura even though they went to the same school. Maura falls in love with the barman Gerry O'Sullivan and becomes pregnant. They marry, but the child is born with Down syndrome and Gerry abandons Maura to face it alone. She then works for the Darcys who have opened a new shop in the village. She solves the mystery of Gloria's missing jewels and ends up owning them.

Leo Murphy is the last child still at home. She lives with her injured soldier father and mother. Her teenage life is caught in the tangle her mother has made and she thinks she can never be normal again. She finds love, which helps her to break down the walls she made for herself.

Foxy Dunne from the slums never gives up. He works his way up in life and becomes a builder. He helps Leo forget her miseries and leave them behind.

Eddie Barton lives with his seamstress mother. He writes to his pen friend in Scotland, and eventually it turns into love. Both of them are worried about their appearances and don't know if they will be accepted by the other. The pen friend comes down to Shancarrig and gives a new lease of life to Eddie and his mother.

Nessa Ryan thinks her mother is bossy, and she grows up to be a person of strong character, choosing the right man for her life.

Niall Hayes doesn't know how to get what he wants in life. His cousin Richard takes everything Niall desires: a place in his father's solicitor's firm and the girl he loves. How he gets all this is the crux of his story.

Jim and Nora Kelly, the school master and mistress, are dedicated to teaching the children despite their own infertility. Nora's twin sister Helen returns home to visit with her four-year-old daughter, Maria, and is killed in a freak road accident, leaving the Kellys to care for the child and hope that she can remain with them.

Other characters include Maddy Ross, Father Brian Barry, Michael and Gloria Darcy, Dr. Jims Blake and his son Declan, and Father Gunn and his housekeeper Mrs. Kennedy.

The novel ends with the sale of the schoolhouse, with many of the main characters showing an interest in purchasing it.

Themes
The novel follows a changing Irish society in the 1950s and 1960s. Social barriers that divided families for generations begin to fall, as for example a boy from the lowest socioeconomic class ends up marrying the daughter of an army major. Numerous female characters are also depicted as "strong, independent women of the 1950s [who have] no time for silly romances".

Audiobook
The novel was recorded as a BBC audiobook in 2007.

References

External links
Fantastic fiction

1992 Irish novels
Novels by Maeve Binchy
Fiction set in the 1950s
Fiction set in the 1960s
Novels set in Ireland